Eugene Station is the primary bus station and terminus in Eugene, Oregon, United States, serving the buses of the Lane Transit District (LTD). Construction began with the official groundbreaking in 1996 and the station opened in April, 1998. The station covers most of a city block, and includes a clock tower featuring glass pyramids and arches inset with colorful glass blocks created by local glass artist John Rose. Bus lines include LTD's EmX service.

References

External links
Lane Transit District (official website)
Eugene Station page
Photos Of Eugene Station on bcx.news

Bus transportation in Oregon
Buildings and structures in Eugene, Oregon
Transportation in Eugene, Oregon
1998 establishments in Oregon
Transportation buildings and structures in Lane County, Oregon